Lieutenant-Colonel Ralph Gerald Ritson (1880 – October 25, 1966) was a member of  the Inniskilling Dragoons and a champion polo player with a ten-goal handicap.

Biography
He was born in 1880 in England to Utrick Alexander Ritson, of Calf Hall, Muggleswick Park, Co. Durham, and Annie Ridley. In 1911 he won the Roehampton Trophy with fellow players Jean de Madre and Leslie St. Clair Cheape. That same year he won the King's Coronation Cup with Leslie St. Clair Cheape, Major Shah Mirza Beg of the Hyderabad Lancers, and Vivian Noverre Lockett.

He captained the British polo team in the 1913 International Polo Cup at the Meadowbrook Polo Club and his teammates were  Leslie St. Clair Cheape and Vivian Noverre Lockett.

On June 1, 1926 he married Lady Kitty Edith Blanche Ogilvy, daughter of David Ogilvy, 11th Earl of Airlie and Mabell Ogilvy, Countess of Airlie.

He died on October 25, 1966 in South Africa where he was working for Wiggins Teape.

References 

English polo players
1880s births
1966 deaths
International Polo Cup
Roehampton Trophy
Place of birth missing
6th (Inniskilling) Dragoons officers
People from County Durham (district)